Wei Zhen is the name of:

We1less (born 1997), real name Wei Zhen, Chinese League of Legends professional player
Wei Zhen (footballer) (born 1997), Chinese association footballer